Armenia has participated at the Youth Olympic Games in every edition since the inaugural 2010 Games.

Medal tables

Medals by Summer Games

Medals by Winter Games

Medals by summer sport

Medals by winter sport

List of medalists

Summer Games

Flag bearers

See also
Armenia at the Olympics
Armenia at the Paralympics

External links
Armenian Olympic Committee

 
Nations at the Youth Olympic Games
Youth sport in Armenia